Claude de Choiseul-Francières (1 January 1632 – 15 March 1711) was count of Choiseul, marquis of Francières, seigneur d'Yroüerre, and a Marshal of France beginning in 1693.

Claude de Choiseul-Francières was the son of Louis de Francières, baron and later marquis of Francières, seigneur d'Yroüerre and of Catherine de Nicey.

He distinguished himself in the Battle of Seneffe against the Dutch Republic and later fought at the Battle of Ortenbach. He was brigadier in 1667, Maréchal de camp in 1669, Lieutenant-general in 1676 and finally Marshal of France in 1693.

On 5 May 1658 he married Catherine (died 17 October 1710), daughter of Gaston de Renty, baron of Landelles. He was buried in the church of the Order of Picpus (57, rue de Picpus). His remains were rediscovered in 1860 and reburied in the Père Lachaise Cemetery.

References

Burials at Père Lachaise Cemetery
Claude
Marshals of France
1632 births
1711 deaths
French military personnel of the Franco-Dutch War